Olley may refer to:

People
 Chris Olley, English artist
 Frank Olley (1927–1988), Australian politician
 Gordon Olley, English flying ace
 Greg Olley (born 1996), English football player
 Jonathan Olley (born 1967), British photographer
June Norma Olley (1924–2019), British-born Australian seafood technologist 
 Ken Olley, New Zealand football player
 Margaret Olley (1923–2011), Australian painter
 Martin Olley (born 1963), English cricket player
 Michelle Olley, British writer, journalist and magazine and book editor
 Robert Olley (born 1940), English artist

Places
 Olley, Meurthe-et-Moselle, France

Other
 'Olley v Marlborough Court Ltd, 1949 English contract law case